Colurus may refer to two different genera:
 Colurus, a synonym for Proparachaetopsis, a genus of flies
 Colurus, a synonym for Colurella, a genus of rotifers